Gazosa are an Italian teen band, best known for the song "www.mipiacitu".

Career 
The band formed in 1998 as Eta Beta and then Zeta Beta, and originally consisted of Jessica Morlacchi (b. 1987, vocalist and bass guitar), Vincenzo Siani (b. 1986, drums), and the brothers Federico Paciotti (b. 1987, guitar) and Valentina Paciotti (b. 1985, keyboards). Put under contract by Caterina Caselli, they made their official debut in 1999, with the Abba's cover "Mamma Mia". Their self-titled debut album was released in 2000 and it mixed new songs and covers.

In 2001 the band entered the 51st edition of the Sanremo Music Festival and won the newcomers' competition with the song "Stai con me (Forever)". In the summer they got a large commercial success with "www.mipiacitu", which became theme song of a series of Omnitel commercials and peaked at the fourth place on the Italian hit parade.

In 2002 the group returned to the Sanremo Festival, this time competing in the Big Artists section, and placed tenth with the song "Ogni giorno di più". After releasing a cover version of "Nessuno mi può giudicare", the group disbanded in 2003, with Jessica Morlacchi and Federico Paciotti starting their solo career. In 2009 the musical project was restarted; active only in live events, it has a different line-up except for the drummer Vincenzo Siani.

Discography 
Albums
 
     2000 - Gazosa
     2001 - www.mipiacitu
     2002 - Inseparabili

Singles
 
     1999 - "Mamma Mia"
     2001 - "Stai con me (Forever)"
     2001 - "www.mipiacitu"
     2002 - "Ogni giorno di più"
     2003 - "Nessuno mi può giudicare" (ft. Tormento)

References

External links
 

 

Italian pop music groups
Living people
Musical groups established in 1998
Sanremo Music Festival winners of the newcomers section
Year of birth missing (living people)